Joshua Bauer (born July 22, 1998) is an American soccer player who plays as a centerback for Major League Soccer club Nashville SC.

Career

Youth, college & amateur 
Bauer played youth soccer with GPS New Hampshire Classics Elite, helping them to a pair of state titles in 2014 and 2015. He then went on to play college soccer at the University of New Hampshire between 2017 and 2019. Whilst with the Wildcats, Bauer made 60 appearances, scoring 10 goals and tallying 10 assists.

He was named a United Soccer Coaches First Team All-American in his senior season and was a 2019 MAC Hermann Trophy Semifinalist. He also won accolades such as  America East Defender of the Year, ECAC Defender of the Year in 2018 and 2019, and is only the second player ever to be named the America East Tournament Most Outstanding Player twice. He was also a 2018 United Soccer Coaches Second Team All-American and a United Soccer Coaches First Team Scholar Athlete in 2019.

Whilst at college, Bauer also played in the USL League Two with spells at Seacoast United Phantoms, Boston Bolts and Seattle Sounders FC U-23.

Professional 
On August 19, 2020, Bauer signed his first professional contract with USL Championship side Birmingham Legion. He made his professional debut on August 29, 2020, appearing as an 84th-minute substitute during a 4–1 win over Charlotte Independence. He was out of contract following the 2020 season to be able to participate in the 2021 MLS SuperDraft.

On January 21, 2021, Bauer was selected 31st overall in the 2021 MLS SuperDraft by Atlanta United.
He officially signed a first team contract on April 15, 2021.

Following the 2021 season, Bauer's contract option was declined by Atlanta. On December 17, 2021 he was selected in Stage One of the 2021 MLS Re-Entry Draft by Nashville SC.

Bauer joined Sacramento Republic on a short-term loan on July 29, 2022.

References

External links 
 Josh Bauer – 2019 – Men's Soccer UNH bio
 Josh Bauer Birmingham Legion bio

1998 births
All-American men's college soccer players
American soccer players
Association football defenders
Atlanta United FC draft picks
Atlanta United FC players
Atlanta United 2 players
Birmingham Legion FC players
Boston Bolts players
Living people
Nashville SC players
New Hampshire Wildcats men's soccer players
People from Bedford, New Hampshire
Sacramento Republic FC players
Seacoast United Phantoms players
Seattle Sounders FC U-23 players
Soccer players from New Hampshire
USL Championship players
USL League Two players